TAGS can refer to :

 The Andy Griffith Show
 (Ag--Ge--Sb--Te) thermoelectric material
 Transparent Armor Gun Shield